Throughline is a historical podcast and radio program from American public radio network NPR. The podcast aims to contextualize current events by exploring the historical events that contributed to them. Its episodes have outlined the history of modern political debates, civil rights issues, and domestic and international policy. The show is NPR's first history podcast.

Hosts and program
Throughline is hosted by Ramtin Arablouei and Rund Abdelfatah, radio producers who previously worked on NPR programs such as TED Radio Hour and How I Built This. Arablouei is Iranian-American and Abdelfatah is Palestinian-American; both have spoken about the importance of Middle Eastern representation in American media.

The podcast focuses on the relationship between the latest news and historical events - "go[ing] back in time to understand the present." Its sound design incorporates discussion between the two hosts, as well as interviews with historians and audio clips from historical newscasts and recordings. The show also aims to tell the histories of underrepresented and forgotten people in the United States, often airing stories about racial and religious minorities.

History
Throughline launched on February 7, 2019. It gained notability in 2020 and 2021 with episodes that addressed the history of policing in America, the development of the N-95 mask, the establishment of the electoral college, and the rise of the modern white power movement.

Starting on January 15, 2021, NPR has made Throughline episodes available to local public radio stations as a radio show.

Awards and reception
In 2019, Throughline was included in both TIME and The Atlantic lists of the 50 Best Podcasts of the year. It was also included in lists of the best political or historical podcasts by Oprah Magazine, Town & Country, and GQ in 2020.

Throughline was nominated for Best History Podcast in the 2021 iHeartRadio Podcast Awards.

Throughline won a Peabody Award for a 2021 episode about the history and culture of Afghanistan.

See also 

 List of history podcasts

References

External links
 Official website
 Throughline on iTunes
 Throughline on Twitter

2019 podcast debuts
News podcasts
History podcasts
Educational podcasts
Works about American history
NPR programs
Audio podcasts
American news radio programs